The Social Democratic Youth of Denmark (DSU) is the national youth wing of the Danish Social Democrats. It is not to be confused with Frit Forum, which is for those in higher education, and whose membership is not restricted by age, unlike the DSU. The organisation is autonomous from the Social Democrats and as such is entitled to formulate its own policies and devise its own campaigns.

The Social Democratic Youth movement  was established in 1920 after a break-up of the former youth organisation, the Social Democratic Youth League (SUF). At first, the organisation was known as the "DsU". The founders of DSU wanted to change the Danish society by gradual reforms and not by revolution.

Affiliations 
DSU is a member of Dansk Ungdoms Fællesråd (DUF), the Forbundet Nordens Socialdemokratiske Ungdom (FNSU), the Young European Socialists (YES) and the International Union of Socialist Youth (IUSY).

Chairs 

The incumbent chair of Social Democratic Youth is Katrine Evelyn Jensen, who was elected at the DSU 2022 Congress in May. The general secretary of the DSU is Signe Kaulberg Jespersen, who was also elected at the 2022 Congress in May.

Former DSU chairs:

Organisation 

The legislative and most powerful assembly is the national convention, held every second year in April or May. It consists of 235 delegates, mainly elected in the local branches. The convention is approving the annual accounts of the national organisation, it is deciding new organizational work programmes, political resolutions and proposals and is finally electing a national executive committee.

The national executive committee ("Forretningsudvalget") consists of 10 elected members and also the chairperson, the vice-chairperson and the secretary general. They are elected at the convention too. The chairperson, the vice-chairperson and the secretary general are receiving an economic compensation/fee for their jobs.

Above the national executive committee, DSU has a kind of "second chamber", the major council Hovedbestyrelsen, which consists of the national executive committee (13 members) and 29 local representatives, elected in the 10 regions. The Social Democrats and Frit Forum, the Social Democrats' student wing, have one observer each. Hovedbestyrelsen is also the highest the most powerful assembly between conventions.

DSU has three different nationwide, permanent committees with members from all levels in the organization and from everywhere in Denmark. The committees have the following topics and tasks:
 Activities and seminars (planning of national events etc.) (abb. "AKU" )
 International affairs and cooperation (abb. "IU")
 Editor's group, Members' magazine ("DSU'eren")

DSU is divided into 10 regions, following the borders of the Danish major constituencies. Each region has a regional executive committee and is every year electing their local representatives to Hovedbestyrelsen.

DSU has around 60 local branches, though these may come and go at any moment and is therefore not an exact figure. The local branches are responsible for local activities and local campaigns. DSU has in the local communities an important role in the campaign work for the Social Democrats. Especially when it comes to door-to-door campaigning, inspired from the 2008 Obama election campaign, the DSU has an important role.

References

External links 
 Official homepage of Danmarks Socialdemokratiske Ungdom 

Youth wings of political parties in Denmark
Youth wings of social democratic parties
1920 establishments in Denmark
Social Democrats (Denmark)
Youth organizations established in 1920